Lake Chaupijocha (possibly from Quechua chawpi middle, central, qucha lake) is a lake in the Ayacucho Region in Peru. It is located in the Lucanas Province, Chipao District. Lake Chaupijocha lies northwest of Wat'aqucha and east of Suyt'uqucha.

References

Lakes of Peru
Lakes of Ayacucho Region